Bangladesh Krira Shikkha Protishtan (BKSP) (Bangladesh Institute of Sports Education) is the national sports institute of Bangladesh. It is a government-funded autonomous institution.

History and management
Bangladesh Krira Shikkha Protishtan was established in 1986 with the objective of developing sports in Bangladesh. BKSP is run by a Board of Governors, which is headed by the Minister of Youth and Sports. Brigadier General Anwar Shadat Abu Md Fuad is the Director General of BKSP.

Education
Students at BKSP receive a general education as well as specialized sports training. The education extends from secondary school level to university degree level. The college is fully residential. Students are accommodated in four hostels for boys and one for girls. They receive food, medical treatment and sports materials. Tuition fees are determined on the basis of family income. Most of the teachers also live at the campus.

The sports taught at BKSP are cricket, football, table tennis, archery, athletics, karate, boxing, judo, basketball, swimming, hockey, volleyball, gymnastics, shooting, tennis, taekwondo and wushu. Students must pass tests to be accepted into BKSP.

Cricket team
The institute's cricket team has played in various competitions in Bangladesh since the academy's founding. It began playing List A cricket in the 2018–19 Dhaka Premier Division Cricket League and T20 cricket in the 2018–19 Dhaka Premier Division Twenty20 Cricket League. Many of its players have gone on to represent Bangladesh.

Football team
The Bangladesh Krira Shikkha Protishtan football team has taken part in the lower divisions of Bangladeshi football since the mid 2000s. The football team has also won international trophies such as Gothia Cup from Sweden and Subroto Cup from India. As of late they took part in the 2021–22 Dhaka Second Division Football League.

Notable alumni
Asif Hossain Khan, first Bangladeshi shooter to win a gold at the Commonwealth Games.
 Shakib Al Hasan, cricketer, Bangladesh cricket team
Raqibul Hasan, cricketer, Bangladesh cricket team
 Mushfiqur Rahim, cricketer, Bangladesh cricket team
 Abdur Razzak, cricketer, Bangladesh cricket team
 Soumya Sarkar, cricketer, Bangladesh cricket team
 Anamul Haque, cricketer, Bangladesh cricket team
 Mominul Haque, cricketer, Bangladesh cricket team
 Nasir Hossain, cricketer, Bangladesh cricket team
 Naeem Islam, cricketer, Bangladesh cricket team
 Suhrawadi Shuvo, cricketer, Bangladesh cricket team
 Shafiul Islam, cricketer, Bangladesh cricket team
 Mamunul Islam, footballer, Bangladesh football team
 Mohamed Sohel Al-Masum, footballer, Bangladesh football team
 Hassan Al-Mamun, footballer, Bangladesh football team
 Firoj Mahmud Titu, footballer, Bangladesh football team
 Zahid Hasan Ameli, footballer, Bangladesh football team
 Hemanta Vincent Biswas, footballer, Bangladesh football team
 Mohammad Jewel, footballer, Bangladesh football team
 Maraz Hossain Opi, footballer, Bangladesh football team
 Foysal Ahmed Fahim, footballer, Bangladesh football team

See also
 Bangladesh Krira Shikkha Protishtan football team
 Bangladesh Krira Shikkha Protisthan cricket grounds
 Stadiums in Bangladesh
 Bangladesh Krira Shikkha Protishtan cricket team

References

External links
 Bangladesh Krira Shikkha Protishtan website

Institute
Schools in Bangladesh
1986 establishments in Bangladesh
Bangladesh
Institute of Sports Education